The office of the Moderator of the General Assembly was the highest elected position in the Presbyterian Church in the United States of America (PCUSA).  The Moderator was responsible for presiding over the meeting of the General Assembly, which was held annually between 1789 and 1956.  After the meeting, which lasted for about a week, the Moderator served as an ambassador of the denomination throughout the remainder of the term.  After completing the term, most former Moderators took on the role of a church statesman.

Prior to the Old School–New School Controversy 
The chart below shows the Moderators and place of meetings from 1789 when the PCUSA was formed, until 1837, after which the denomination was divided into two factions by the Old School–New School Controversy until 1869.

Old School 
The chart below shows the Moderators, and the place of meetings, of the Old School branch from 1838 until 1869, after which the two branches reunited into one denomination.

New School 
The chart below shows the Moderators, and the place of meetings, of the New School branch from 1838 until 1869, after which the two branches reunited into one denomination.

Reunited Old and New Schools 
The chart below shows the Moderators, and the place of meetings 1870 when the Old and New Schools had reunited until 1958 when the PCUSA merged with the United Presbyterian Church of North America (UPCNA) to form the United Presbyterian Church in the United States of America.

See also
List of Moderators of the General Assembly of the Presbyterian Church (USA)

References

Presbyterianism in the United States
American Christian clergy
Moderators